Cremlyn is an area in the  community of Biwmares, Ynys Môn, Wales, which is 130.4 miles (209.8 km) from Cardiff and 208.5 miles (335.6 km) from London.

References

See also
List of localities in Wales by population

Villages in Anglesey